Geoff Arbourne is a British film producer and founder of Inside Out Films, an independent company that specialises in film production and television production.

His films have been shown in film festivals worldwide, broadcast on the BBC (Storyville (TV series), Independent Lens and Canal+ and available on demand on iTunes, Amazon Prime and Netflix. His awards include; a News & Documentary Emmy Award in 2018 for Outstanding Politics and Government Documentary, and Tromsø International Faith in Film Award.

In 2015, he produced one of the first short documentaries, Beitar Jerusalem, for The Guardian online platform. It attracted over a million views within the first 24 hours. He then went on to produce the Emmy Award-winning feature documentary Forever Pure, supported by the Tribeca Institute and Sundance Institute. Forever Pure had its international premiere at Toronto Film Festival in 2016, played over 100 festivals, winning numerous awards, and was broadcast or on demand on BBC Storyville, iTunes and Netflix. On winning the Van Leer Award at the Jerusalem Film Festival, the jury stated, "By placing it in a wider socio-political and historical context, the film transcends its nominal subject, football and explores issues such as racism, mob mentality and abuse of power." Releasing the film caused a significant backlash from many of the Beitar fans, putting the director Maya Zinshtein's life at risk.

Arbourne is an affiliate member of Producers Alliance for Cinema and Television (Pact).

Filmography

As production company

Awards 
(All for Forever Pure)
Winner, EMMY Awards News & Documentary Outstanding Politics Documentary 2018
Nominated for Best Documentary 2017 at The Israeli Academy of film and Television
Winner, The Jewish Experience Awards (Honourable Mention) at the Jerusalem Film Festival 2016
 Winner, The Haggiag Award for Best Editing at the Jerusalem Film Festival 2016
 Winner, The Van Leer Award for Best Director of a Documentary at the Jerusalem Film Festival 2016
Winner, The Faith in Film Award 2017 at Tromsø International Film Festival
Jury Special Mention at Riverrun International Film Festival

References

External links
 
 

Living people
1977 births
British documentary film producers